Fiebrigiella gracilis is a species of flowering plants in the legume family, Fabaceae. It belongs to the subfamily Faboideae, and was recently assigned to the informal monophyletic Pterocarpus clade of the Dalbergieae. It is the only member of the genus Fiebrigiella.

The genus Fiebrigiella was named in honor of German-Paraguayan botanist Karl August Gustav Fiebrig.

References

Dalbergieae
Monotypic Fabaceae genera